Chuck Bennett (born 1948) is an American politician who formerly served as mayor of Salem, Oregon, and is a former state representative.

Biography
Bennett graduated from Willamette University in 1970 and became a journalist. He was later elected to the Oregon House of Representatives in 1982 (after an unsuccessful 1978 run), and to the Salem city council from Ward 1 in 2006. He unsuccessfully ran for mayor in 2010, losing to Anna M. Peterson. Bennett once again ran for mayor in 2016 and won. On October 18, 2022, Bennett announced his resignation as mayor, which took effect on November 2, 2022. Chris Hoy, who won the election for mayor and was set to take office in 2023, instead took office immediately following Bennett’s leave from office, on November 2, 2022.

Personal life
Bennett and his wife Cherie have 1 child.

References

External links
 Campaign website

1948 births
Democratic Party members of the Oregon House of Representatives
Living people
Mayors of Salem, Oregon
Oregon city council members
Willamette University alumni